"Lonesome Tears in My Eyes" is a song written by Johnny Burnette, Dorsey Burnette, Paul Burlison and Al Mortimer. It was first released by co-writer Johnny Burnette and his Rock 'n' Roll Trio in December 1956, and has been covered by various artists, including the Beatles.

Original version 
Johnny Burnette, recorded "Lonesome Tears in My Eyes" for his studio album Johnny Burnette and the Rock 'n Roll Trio, the song was composed together with Dorsey Burnette (his brother), Paul Burlison and Al Mortimer.

The UK label Mabel's Record Co. release it unofficially as a single along Your Baby Blue Eyes on B-side.

Personnel
 Tony Austin – drums
Paul Burlison – electric guitar
Dorsey Burnette – bass fiddle
Johnny Burnette – vocals, rhythm guitar
Eddie Gray – drums
Grady Martin – guitar

The Beatles version 
The Beatles, recorded "Lonesome Tears in My Eyes" "live in studio" for the BBC radio programme Pop Go The Beatles on 10 July 1963, and later transmitted on 23 July. In 1994, their recording was commercially released on the album Live at the BBC. The song also influenced a later Beatles song, "The Ballad of John and Yoko" in that the outro guitar riff to that song was inspired by the corresponding intro guitar riff on "Lonesome Tears in My Eyes". On the BBC recording, John Lennon introduces the song as "recorded in 1822".

Personnel 
 John Lennon – vocals, lead guitar
 Paul McCartney – bass
 George Harrison – guitar
 Ringo Starr – drums

Covers
Other artists that have covered the song include:
The Crank Tones
Los Fabulocos
The Four Charms
Frantic Flintstone
The Go Getters
Roy Kay Trio
Sonny Rogers
Royal Crown Revue
Tennessee Trio
Los Primitivos
The Hot Shakers

See also
1956 in music

Notes

References

1957 songs
The Beatles songs
Songs written by Dorsey Burnette
Songs written by Johnny Burnette